Funke Digital TV (formerly known as "Funke Antennen") is a digital television products supplier, stationed in Boxtel, Netherlands. Currently, Funke Digital TV delivers mainly DTT antennas (indoor, outdoor, automotive and portable) to various countries around the globe, including the Netherlands, Russia, Germany, Norway, Sweden, Finland, Denmark, United Kingdom, Ireland, Belgium, Austria, Portugal, Spain, Italy, France, Greece, Ukraine and various countries in Africa.

References

Companies based in North Brabant
Electronics companies of the Netherlands